Alfred Victor "Sonny" Avery (19 December 1914 – 12 May 1997) was an English cricketer. He played for Essex between 1935 and 1954.

Sonny Avery was a right-handed opening batsman, "a good player of in-swing and a powerful cutter who held the bat low down and often suffered injured hands as a result". He and Dickie Dodds formed a strong opening partnership for Essex in the seasons after the Second World War. He played in a Test trial match in 1946 when England were looking for new players, top-scoring with 79 in the first innings of the Rest of England team, but was never selected for the national team. 

A few days before the Test trial he had scored 210 for Essex against Surrey at The Oval. Surrey had been dismissed for 162 on the first afternoon, and by stumps Essex were 235 for no wicket, Avery on 140 not out. Essex went on to win by an innings. 

Avery made 1000 runs in a season seven times. His 25 centuries included four double-centuries, with a highest score of 224 against Northamptonshire in 1952.

After his playing career ended he coached Gloucestershire and at Monmouth School.

References

External links

1914 births
1997 deaths
English cricketers
Essex cricketers
People from the London Borough of Newham
People from Essex (before 1965)
English cricket coaches
English cricketers of 1919 to 1945